Hyblaea aterrima is a moth in the family Hyblaeidae described by William Jacob Holland in 1900.

References

Hyblaeidae